Colchester and Ipswich Museums Service (CIMS) was established in 2007 to provide joint services to the residents of Ipswich and Colchester. Colchester Borough Council was the designated lead authority.

CIMS runs seven venues:

Resource Centre
The CIMS Resource Centre is based in Colchester. Over 100 artworks are kept here.

Colchester heritage venues

 Colchester Castle, Castle Park
 Hollytrees Museum, Castle Park
 Colchester Natural History Museum, High Street

Ipswich heritage venues
CIMS manages three properties belonging to Ipswich Borough Council
 Christchurch Mansion
 Ipswich Art Gallery
 Ipswich Museum

References

Organisations based in Colchester
Organizations established in 2007